Shahram Shabpareh is an Iranian Pop singer and songwriter.

Career
He started his career as a drum player in the early 1960s when he was 13. In the mid-1960s at the age of 17, he formed a band of his own named "Rebels".

He was a member of Black Cats from 1964 to 1979, which was started by his brother Shahbal Shabpareh. He embarked a solo career starting in the 70s.

After the Islamic Revolution in 1979, Shahram, who had migrated to California a few years earlier, did not have the opportunity to return to his homeland. Since then, he has been living in the United States.

With a career spanning 50 years, he is a popular artist in Iranian society and his concerts are well received by Iranians all over the world. He is a judge on Persian Talent Show.

Discography

Studio albums

 Taar Taa Geetaar (2012) Avang Music
 Tapesh (2008)
 Fire (2005)
 Donya (2001)
 Didar (1999)
 Rhythm of the Night (1998)
 Do Rahi (1995)
 Story (1995)
 Summer of 94 (1994)
 Summer of 92 (1992)
 Shagerde Aval ℗ 1992 Taraneh Enterprises Inc
 Khejalati (1988)
 Bagheh Alephba ℗ 1987 Pars Video
 Shaparak (1986)
 Madreseh (Pariyah) ℗ 1985 Pars Video
 Telesm (1984)
 Khodaya Che Konam? (1983)
 Iran Iran (1982)
 Mosafer (1981)
 Hich Koja Iran Nemisheh (1980)
 Deyar (1980)
 Gorg Va Bareh ℗ 1999 Taraneh Enterprises Inc
 Rock & Roll (1977)

Filmography
 Booye Gandom (1977)
 Mahiha Dar Khak Mimirand (1977)
 Alafhaye Harz (1976)
 Shabe Ghariban (1975)
 Aroose Dejleh (1974)

References

External links

[ Shahram Shabpareh] at Allmusic

1948 births
Living people
Iranian composers
Iranian guitarists
People from Tehran
Iranian pop singers
Singers from Tehran
Iranian male singers
Iranian pop musicians
Musicians from Tehran
Caltex Records artists
Taraneh Records artists
Persian-language singers
Iranian male film actors
Iranian singer-songwriters
20th-century Iranian people
20th-century Iranian male singers
21st-century Iranian male singers
Iranian emigrants to the United States
Exiles of the Iranian Revolution in the United States